Diethyl maleate is an organic compound with the CAS Registry number 141-05-9. It is chemically a maleate ester with the formula C8H12O4. It is a colorless liquid at room temperature. It has the IUPAC name of diethyl (Z)-but-2-enedioate.

Synthesis
The material is synthesized by the esterification of maleic acid or maleic anhydride and ethanol.

Uses
One of the key uses for the compound is in production of the pesticide Malathion. It has also been used medically as a chemical depletory of glutathione. It has been studied extensively with regard to renal function. Other medical uses include treatment of breast cancer and its monitoring with Positron Emission Tomography. It is also used as a food additive and has Food and Drug Administration clearance for indirect food contact.

In synthetic organic chemistry it is a dienophile and used in the Diels-Alder reaction.

With the invention of polyaspartic technology the material also found another use. With this technology an amine is reacted with a dialkyl maleate - usually diethyl maleate - utilizing the Michael addition reaction. These products are then used in coatings, adhesives, sealants and elastomers.

See also
 Dimethyl maleate
 Dibutyl maleate

References

External links
 Safety Data Sheet Neuchem 

Ethyl esters
Maleate esters